The tallest building in Denver is the 56-story Republic Plaza, which rises  and was completed in 1984. It stands as the 137th-tallest building in the United States, and the tallest building in the state of Colorado. The second-tallest skyscraper in the city and the state is 1801 California Street, which rises . Twenty-nine of the thirty tallest buildings in Colorado are located in Denver.

Background
The history of skyscrapers in Denver began with the completion of the Equitable Building in 1892; this building, rising  and nine floors, was the first high-rise in Denver. The title of the city's "first skyscraper" is usually given to the Daniels & Fisher Tower, which rises  and was completed in 1910. The city went through a large building boom that lasted from the early 1970s to the mid-1980s. During this time, 21 of the city's 27 tallest buildings were constructed, including Republic Plaza, 1801 California Street, and the Wells Fargo Center. , there are 190 completed high-rises in the city.

It now stands as the fourth-tallest building in Denver as well as the city's tallest residential tower. Currently under construction, the 1144 Fifteenth office tower will rise to just over 600 feet at over 40 stories making it the fifth-tallest building in Denver upon completion in late 2017 or early 2018. Denver is currently experiencing a mid-/high-rise residential building boom with several large projects under construction throughout the city with many more breaking ground in the near future.

Like with many large cities in the United States, Denver's CBD and the adjacent neighborhoods were blighted with the presence of many open parking lots in the 1970s and '80s. Recent focus to redevelop these open lots and increase density/activity in the city's core have been hugely successful as many of these lots are today being turned into large residential, retail and commercial developments. This is especially true around the newly redeveloped and highly popular Union Station area in Denver's LoDo (Lower Downtown) neighborhood. What used to be open land, parking lots, warehouses and rail yards as recently as the turn of the century is now several city blocks of new residential and commercial buildings as well as a new RTD underground bus terminal, rail platforms/pavilions and a park. There are also improved pedestrian friendly connections to the RiNo (River North), Five Points, Auraria and Highland neighborhoods from the new development. Historic Union Station itself has been fully renovated and turned back into a travel and activity hub. It now includes the Denver Amtrak station, a new boutique hotel and several restaurants, bars & shops all centered on the large Great Hall inside and a public plaza outside along Wynkoop Street. Starting in April 2016 the University of Colorado A-Line commuter train began service directly connecting Union Station and downtown Denver to Denver International Airport and the airport's new 500-plus-room Westin Hotel & conference center.

Tallest buildings

This includes spires and architectural details but does not include antenna masts. The "Year" column indicates the year in which a building was completed.

* Table entry without text indicate that information regarding building height has not yet been released.

= Building height ranking is tied with another building.

Under construction
This lists buildings that are under construction in Denver and are planned to rise at least .

* Table entries with dashes (—) indicate that information regarding building heights or dates of completion has not yet been released.

Proposed, Under Design Review or Approved
This lists buildings that are either Proposed, actively Under Design Review (Concept or Site Development), or Approved and awaiting construction with the City & County of Denver and that are planned to rise at least .

* Table entries with dashes (—) indicate that information regarding building heights or dates of completion has not yet been released.

Timeline of tallest buildings 

This lists buildings that once held the title of tallest building in Denver.

Notes
 A. New York has 216 existing and under construction buildings at least , Chicago has 114, Miami has 32, Houston has 31, Los Angeles has 26, San Francisco has 21, Dallas has 20, Atlanta has 19, Boston has 19, Seattle has 18, Las Vegas has 16, Philadelphia has 15, Minneapolis has 12, Pittsburgh has 10, Jersey City has 9, Detroit has 8, Denver has 8. Source of skyline ranking information: SkyscraperPage.com: New York, Chicago, Miami, Houston, Los Angeles, Dallas, Atlanta, San Francisco, Las Vegas, Boston, Seattle, Philadelphia, Pittsburgh, Jersey City, Minneapolis, Detroit, Denver.

See also
 List of tallest buildings in the United States

References 
 General
 Emporis.com – Denver
 Specific

External links
 Diagram of Denver skyscrapers on SkyscraperPage
 DenverInfill Blog
Six Fifty 17, Denver

Denver
 
Tallest in Denver